is a 1972 manga by Leiji Matsumoto. It introduces Tochiro Oyama, best friend to  Matsumoto's classic hero, Captain Harlock, who is in turn depicted as a gunslinger in the Old West. In sharp contrast to other Matsumoto's stories, Gun Frontier is a comedy adventure rather than a space opera. Also, unlike other Harlock stories, in Gun Frontier, Harlock is depicted as Tochiro's sidekick.

It is a harsh and barren wasteland, where the weak aren't allowed to dream. It is also a sacred land for true men, for there is no place a man can feel more alive. This is the Gun Frontier. Sea Pirate Captain Harlock and the errant samurai, Tochiro arrive in the United States on the Western Frontier. Along with a mysterious woman they meet along the way, the two friends challenge sex rings, bandits, and corrupt sheriff. They are searching for a lost clan of Japanese immigrants, and they will tear Gun Frontier from end to end until they find it.

Since the original manga, there has been a novel and a 2002 anime adaption of the series.

Characters 
Tochiro Oyama 

He is the main character. He is one of the survivors of Samurai Creek, a town of Japanese immigrants who were mysteriously all slaughtered, with only a few exceptions. Tochiro's purpose is to find the scattered remains of his people, no matter who or what he has to destroy to find them. Tochiro uses a Shikomizue very skillfully, but has awful aim with his gun, a fact which is often poked fun at throughout the series. Despite wearing glasses, he refers to himself as "not being able to see past the end of a shovel [he is] holding". He is also abnormally short, as well as bowlegged, and while he wears his cloak he can often avoid a fatal gunshot wound as his attacker would likely have no idea how small or awkwardly shaped he actually is. He is also a very heavy drinker.

Franklin Harlock Jr.

He is a sea captain turned gunslinger. He owes his life to Tochiro, and therefore takes him to America on his ship. Harlock is a master gunman, a quick draw like no other, and sharp as a tack. He is able to detect that Sinunora is trying to pry him and Tochiro apart for her own unclear reasons. He is very loyal to Tochiro. He is also quite enigmatic and silent, often grumbling and dismissing any mention of the past. Harlock has an x-shaped scar on his cheek, which is later revealed to be from a sword duel he and Tochiro had on Harlock's ship while they were still enemies.

Sinunora

She is a woman who joins Tochiro and Harlock at the end of the first episode. Beautiful and capable, she's not the damsel in distress as she is very good at using manipulation to get out of traps and get what she wants (It's revealed later in the series that she is an expert on human behavior). It also comes to Harlocks attention that Sinunora gets close to the pair so that she can spy on them and report back to the mysterious "Organization that guides the world" but in truth, she eventually is warmed by Tochiro's struggle and uses her position as their tracker to protect them instead. Her real name is never mentioned, except by a man named Baron De Noir F. Tat Endale, always referred with his full name and title, who is believed to be her husband. He mentions the first part of her name being "Anrei", but it is cut off and her real name is never mentioned again.

Shizuku

Darkmeister is the leader of the "organization" that guides the world. He desires Tochiro and all the other Japanese immigrants so that he can force them into slavery. He wants to use their superior knowledge of metalcraft (Known as Stardust Steel) to create unparalleled weapons to use in war to overthrow the American government. His face is never shown, but he is revealed to have incredibly long fingernails. It is also believed that he wears a mask of some kind.

Printing history 
In 1975, the original manga series was compiled into three volumes. In 1988, the manga was reprinted and which Leiji Matsumoto added more content into. In 1999, Leiji Matsumoto published his first novel, Gun Frontier II. The novel was published by Daiwa Shobo and it was told in a non-erotic way compared to the original manga. The novel is now out of print.

Anime 
In 2002, an anime adaptation of the original series aired on AT-X. The opening theme song is called "Style" by Grand Zero, while the ending theme song is called "Ame to Sanbika" by Umeno Yoshizawa.

It started being streamed in the US on Hulu in Fall 2009. In Latin America, it aired through Animax, beginning July 5, 2006. The title was translated to Frontera sin ley, except in Brazil where the original title was kept.

Episodes

References

External links 
 Gun Frontier at Enoki Films
 
 

1972 manga
1999 Japanese novels
2002 anime television series debuts
2002 Japanese television series endings
Adventure anime and manga
Akita Shoten manga
Discotek Media
Leiji Matsumoto
Science fiction anime and manga
Seinen manga
Western (genre) anime and manga